Tommaso Antonio Conti (born 22 November 1941) is a Scottish actor, theatre director, and novelist. He won the Tony Award for Best Actor in a Play in 1979 for his performance in Whose Life Is It Anyway? and was nominated for the Academy Award for Best Actor for the 1983 film Reuben, Reuben.

Early life
Tommaso Antonio Conti was born on 22 November 1941 in Paisley, Renfrewshire, the son of hairdressers Mary McGoldrick and Alfonso Conti. He was brought up Roman Catholic, but is now antireligious. His father was Italian, while his mother was born and raised in Scotland to Irish parents. Conti was educated at independent Catholic boys' school Hamilton Park and at the Royal Scottish Academy of Music and Drama, both in Glasgow.

Career
Conti is a theatre, film, and television actor. He began working with the Dundee Repertory in 1959. He appeared on Broadway in Whose Life Is It Anyway? in 1979, and in London, he played the lead in Jeffrey Bernard is Unwell at the Garrick Theatre.

Besides taking the leading role in the TV versions of Frederic Raphael's The Glittering Prizes and Alan Ayckbourn's The Norman Conquests, Conti appeared in the "Princess and the Pea" episode of the family television series Faerie Tale Theatre, guest-starred on Friends and Cosby, and played opposite Nigel Hawthorne in a long-running series of Vauxhall Astra car advertisements in the United Kingdom during the mid-1990s.

Conti has appeared in such films as Merry Christmas, Mr. Lawrence; Reuben, Reuben; American Dreamer; Shirley Valentine; Miracles; Saving Grace; Dangerous Parking, and Voices Within: The Lives of Truddi Chase.

Conti's novel The Doctor, about a former secret operations pilot for intelligence services, was published in 2004.  According to the foreword, his friend Lynsey De Paul recommended the manuscript to publisher Jeremy Robson.

He appeared in the hit BBC sitcom Miranda alongside Miranda Hart and Patricia Hodge, as Miranda's father, in the 2010 seasonal episode "The Perfect Christmas".

Personal life
Conti has been married to Scottish actress Kara Wilson since 1967 and their daughter Nina is an actress and performs as a ventriloquist. According to Nina, her parents have an open marriage.

Conti is a prominent resident of Hampstead in northwest London, having lived in the area for several decades. Conti was part of a campaign against the opening of a Tesco supermarket in nearby Belsize Park. Conti put his Hampstead house up for sale in 2015 for £17.5 million after his long-running opposition to the building plans of his neighbour, the footballer Thierry Henry. Conti had also opposed development plans for Hampstead's Grove Lodge, the 18th-century Grade II listed former home of novelist John Galsworthy.

Conti participated in a genetic-mapping project conducted by the company ScotlandsDNA (now called BritainsDNA). In 2012, Conti and the company announced that Conti shares a genetic marker with Napoléon Bonaparte. Conti has said that he "burst out laughing" when told he was directly related to Napoléon on his father's side.

Politics
Conti considered running as the Conservative candidate in the 2008 London mayoral election, but did not, and in the following election in 2012, he supported unsuccessful independent candidate Siobhan Benita. In the run up to the 2015 general election, Conti said in an interview published in several newspapers that he was once a Labour supporter but had come to view socialism as a religion with a "vicious, hostile spirit".

Work

Film 
 Galileo (1975) as Andrea Sarti (man)
 Slade in Flame (1975) as Robert Seymour
 The Duellists (1977) as Dr. Jacquin
 Full Circle (1977) as Mark Berkeley
 Eclipse (1977) as Tom / Geoffrey
 Merry Christmas, Mr. Lawrence (1983) as Col. John Lawrence
 Reuben, Reuben (1983) as Gowan McGland
 American Dreamer (1984) as Alan McMann
 Miracles (1986) as Roger
 Saving Grace (1985) as Pope Leo XIV
 Heavenly Pursuits (1986) as Vic Mathews
 Beyond Therapy (1987) as Stuart
 The Quick and the Dead (1987, TV Movie) as Duncan McKaskel
 Roman Holiday (1987, TV Movie) as Joe Bradley
 Two Brothers Running (1988) as Moses Bornstein
 That Summer of White Roses (1989) as Andrija Gavrilovic
 Shirley Valentine (1989) as Costas
 Caccia Alla Vedova (1991) as Conte Angelo di Bosconero
 Someone Else's America (1995) as Alonso
 The Inheritance (1997, TV Movie) as Henry Hamilton
 Sub Down (1997) as Harry Rheinhartdt
 Something to Believe In (1998) as Monsignor Calogero
 Out of Control (1998) as Eddie
 Don't Go Breaking My Heart (1999) as Dr. Fiedler
 The Enemy (2001) as Insp. John Cregar
 Derailed (2005) as Eliot Firth
 Rabbit Fever (2006) as Prof Rosenberg
 Paid (2006) as Rudi
 Almost Heaven (2006) as Bert Gordon
 O Jerusalem (2006) as Sir Cunningham
 Dangerous Parking (2007) as Doc Baker
 Deeply Irresponsible (2007) as Nate (2007)
 A Closed Book (2009) as Sir Paul
 The Tempest (2010) as Gonzalo
 Rekindle (2011) as Dr. Monty Adams
 Streetdance 2 (2012) as Manu
 Run for Your Wife (2012)
 The Dark Knight Rises (2012) as Prisoner
 City Slacker (2012) as Ray
 Paddington 2 (2017) as Judge Gerald Biggleswade
 Oppenheimer (2023) as Albert Einstein (Post-production)

Television 
 Boy Meets Girl (1969) as Frank
 Thirty-Minute Theatre - Revolutions: Fidel Castro (1970) as Che Guevara
 Adam Smith (1972) as Dr. Calvi
 Z Cars (1973) as Gordon Morley
 Barlow at Large (1973) as Myers
 Sam (1974) as David Ellis
 Thriller (1975) as Bruno Varella
 Madame Bovary (1975, TV Mini-Series) as Charles Bovary
 The Glittering Prizes (1976, TV Mini-Series) as Adam Morris
 The Norman Conquests (1977, TV Mini-Series) as Norman
 Blade on the Feather (1980, TV Movie) as Daniel Young
 The Wall (1982, TV Movie) as Dolek Berson
 Faerie Tale Theatre (1984, "Princess and the Pea") as Prince Richard
 Nazi Hunter: The Beate Klarsfeld Story (1986, TV Movie) as Serge Klarsfeld
 The Dumb Waiter (1987)
 Fatal Judgement (1988, TV Movie) as Pat Piscitelli
 Voices Within: The Lives of Truddi Chase (1990, TV Movie) as Doctor 'Stanley' Phillips
 The Old Boy Network (1992) as Lucas Frye
 The Wright Verdicts (1995) as Charles Wright
 The Inheritance (1997, TV Movie) as Henry Hamilton
 Friends (1998, "The One After Ross Says Rachel", and "The One with Ross's Wedding") as Stephen Waltham
 Cosby (1999) as William Shakespeare
 Deadline (2000-2001) as Si Beekman
 I Was a Rat (2001, TV Mini-Series) as Bob Jones
 Andy Pandy (2002) as Narrator (voice)
 Four Seasons (mini series) (2008-2009) as Charles Combe
 Lark Rise to Candleford (2010) as William Bourne / Mr. Reppington
 Miranda (2010) as Charles
 Parents (2012) as Len Miller
 Rosemary's Baby (2014) 
 Doc Martin (TV series) (2019) as Dr Bernard Newton.  Series 9 episode 8

Stage 
 Jeffrey Bernard Is Unwell  
 Whose Life is it Anyway?
 Savages
 The Devil's Disciple
 They're Playing Our Song
 The Real Thing
 An Italian Straw Hat (1986)
 The Ride Down Mt. Morgan
 Chapter Two
 Jesus, My Boy (1998–99, 2009)
 Present Laughter
 Romantic Comedy
 Rough Justice (2012-13)
 Twelve Angry Men (2014)

Stage directing
The Last of the Red Hot Lovers
Present Laughter
Otherwise Engaged

Awards 
National Board of Review for Best Actor (Reuben, Reuben and Merry Christmas, Mr. Lawrence)
Academy Award nomination as Best Actor (Reuben, Reuben)
Golden Globe nominations for Reuben, Reuben and Nazi Hunter: The Beate Klarsfeld Story
Tony Award for Best Actor (Whose Life Is It Anyway?)
Laurence Olivier Award for Actor of the Year in a New Play ('Whose Life is it Anyway?)
Variety Club Award for Best Actor (Whose Life is it Anyway?'')

References

External links

1941 births
Living people
20th-century Scottish male actors
21st-century Scottish male actors
Alumni of the Royal Conservatoire of Scotland
21st-century Scottish novelists
Former Roman Catholics
Laurence Olivier Award winners
Male actors from Paisley, Renfrewshire
Scottish atheists
Scottish male film actors
Scottish male stage actors
Scottish male television actors
Scottish people of French descent
Scottish people of Irish descent
Scottish people of Italian descent
Tony Award winners
Writers from Paisley, Renfrewshire
20th-century atheists
21st-century atheists